Antonio Allegra (1905 – 1969) was an Italian organist and lyricist. As one of the organists of St. Peter's Basilica at his time, he wrote the words to Inno e Marcia Pontificale, which was adopted in 1949 as the national anthem of the Holy See (Vatican City).  The music was by Charles Gounod.

References 

Italian male songwriters
1905 births
1969 deaths
20th-century Italian musicians
20th-century Italian male musicians